Ribes victoris is an uncommon North American species of currant known by the common name Victor's gooseberry. It is endemic to California, where it grows in the chaparral and woods of canyons in the San Francisco Bay Area and counties to the north, as far as Humboldt County.

Ribes victorisis an erect shrub growing up to two meters (80 inches) in height, its stem coated in sticky glandular hairs and some bristles, with spines occurring at nodes. The hairy, glandular leaves are divided into a few lobes which are lined with teeth. The inflorescence is made up of one or two flowers hanging from the branches. Each flower has five reflexed sepals which are white with a pink blush at the bases around a central corolla of white petals. The whitish stamens and stigmas protrude from the center. The fruit is a yellow berry about a centimeter wide which is covered in glandular bristles.

References

External links
Jepson Manual Treatment
Calphotos Photo gallery, University of California

victoris
Plants described in 1888
Endemic flora of California
Flora without expected TNC conservation status